Gurbhakot is an urban municipality located in Surkhet District of Karnali province of Nepal.

The municipality is divided into total 14 wards. Malarani, Dharapani and Sahare VDC were Incorporated with Subhaghat Gangamala municipality in 2017 when government cancelled all old administration system and introduce new 753 local level administrative body.

The municipality is surrounded by Salyan in east, Bheriganga in west, Simta and Chingad in north and Salyan in south.

History
Subhaghat Gangamala municipality was established on 1 December 2015 merging 4 VDC Dahachaur, Ghumkhahare, Gumi and Mehelkuna.

In 2017 when new administrative system applied Malarani, Dharapani and Sahare incorporated with Subhaghat Gangamala municipality and renamed as Gurbhakot municipality.

Demographics
At the time of the 2011 Nepal census, Gurbhakot Municipality had a population of 44,359. Of these, 95.5% spoke Nepali, 4.3% Magar, 0.1% Maithili and 0.1% other languages as their first language.

In terms of ethnicity/caste, 29.2% were Chhetri, 26.9% Kami, 26.2% Magar, 5.0% Hill Brahmin, 3.4% Damai/Dholi, 2.8% Thakuri, 2.2% Gurung, 1.9% Sarki, 0.8% Sanyasi/Dasnami and 1.6% others.

In terms of religion, 96.1% were Hindu, 2.6% Christian, 1.1% Buddhist, 0.1% Muslim and 0.1% others.

References

External links
 www.gurbhakotmun.gov.np

Municipalities in Karnali Province
Nepal municipalities established in 2015